Fire Station No. 6, and variations, may refer to:

 Fire Station No. 6 (Birmingham, Alabama), listed on the National Register of Historic Places (NRHP)
 Fire Station No. 6 (Sacramento, California), NRHP-listed
 Fire Station No. 6 (Atlanta), included in the Martin Luther King, Jr., National Historic Site
 Engine House No. 6 (Wichita, Kansas), NRHP-listed
 James Geddes Engine Company No. 6, Nashville, Tennessee, NRHP-listed
 Truck Company F, Washington, D.C., also known as "Truck Company 6", NRHP-listed

See also
List of fire stations